Radvaň is a borough of Banská Bystrica, located south-west of the city centre. Until 1964 it was a separate village, when it was merged into the village of Radvaň-Kráľová, which in turn was made part of Banská Bystrica in 1966.

It was first mentioned in 1263. The annual Radvaň fairs on 8 September have been held since 1650, transferred in the 20th century to Banská Bystrica. The writer Andrej Sládkovič lived and worked in Radvaň from 1856 until his death in 1872.

Banská Bystrica